Leaside is an underground light rail transit (LRT) station under construction on Line 5 Eglinton, a new line that is part of the Toronto subway system. It will be located in the Leaside neighbourhood at the intersection of Bayview Avenue and Eglinton Avenue. It is scheduled to open in 2023.

During the planning stages for Line 5 Eglinton, the station was given the working name "Bayview", which is identical to the pre-existing Bayview station on Line 4 Sheppard. On November 23, 2015, a report to the TTC Board recommended giving a unique name to each station in the subway system (including Line 5 Eglinton). Thus, the LRT station was renamed "Leaside".

Located at the intersection with Bayview Avenue, this underground station will have two entrances on opposite corners: the main entry at the southeast (replacing a McDonald's) and a secondary entry on the northwest (in the corner of a retail parking lot). Nearby destinations include Howard Talbot Park, Leaside High School, the Leaside neighbourhood, Mount Hope Catholic Cemetery, and the Sunnybrook Health Sciences Centre complex.

Station site
In October 2013, local residents learned that Metrolinx negotiations with Countrywide Homes, the current owner, allowed the owner to propose to build a new condominium over the station.
Metrolinx will be acquiring several adjacent properties, not necessary for constructing the station, because they fit within the plan to put the property to dual use. Sam Balsamo, an executive with the developer, characterized the dual-use plan "a unique opportunity because it will potentially be one of the only stops where you’ll have residential right above a subway stop". Councillor Jon Burnside voiced concern that the developer will use the association with new line to argue for an exemption to the current height restrictions for the area of nine storeys and instead build a high-rise.

A McDonald's restaurant, on the southeast corner of Bayview and Eglinton Avenues, was closed on September 24, 2015, to make way for the station. The restaurant had been part of the community for over 30 years. It had been a contentious subject during town hall meetings, as the construction of the new light rail system that is replacing it will have a great impact on the community. The McDonald's had been a neighbourhood icon thanks to its distinctive design, with the restaurant perched on top of a ground-floor parking lot, and its proximity to neighbouring Howard Talbot Park, where residents could often watch students from nearby Leaside High School play baseball after buying dinner.

Surface connections 

, the following are the proposed connecting routes that would serve this station when Line 5 Eglinton opens:

References

External links
Bayview Station project page at the Eglinton Crosstown website.

Line 5 Eglinton stations